Suastus minuta, the small palm bob, is a butterfly belonging to the family Hesperiidae. It is found in the Indomalayan realm - south India, Sikkim to Burma, Sri Lanka, Thailand, Laos, Hainan, Vietnam and (S. m. flemingi  Eliot, 1973) Malaya.

Description

References

Hesperiinae
Butterflies of Asia